This is a list of Irish counties ranked by the length of their coastline. Ireland is an island in the north Atlantic Ocean, and is surrounded on all sides by the Atlantic and two of its local seas, the Celtic Sea off the island's south coast and the Irish Sea off its east coast. Seventeen counties have an ocean/sea coastline: nine with a coastline on the Atlantic Ocean, seven with an Irish sea coastline and three with a coastline on the Celtic Sea. Three of these counties border two bodies of water; namely Antrim (Atlantic Ocean and Irish Sea), Wexford (Irish Sea and Celtic Sea) and Cork (Celtic Sea and Atlantic Ocean). Additionally, Limerick and southern Kilkenny border the tidal zones of the rivers Shannon and Suir. Both counties also have active ports at Foynes and Belview, but have no exposed coastline.

Two sources are used: the first is a 1999 study by Brigitte Neilson and Mark Costello of Trinity College Dublin. The study mapped the low-tide coastline of Ireland and its offshore islands using a Geographic information system. The study breaks down the coastline of each county on the island of Ireland into mainland and offshore lengths, and is one of the most cited studies on Irish coastal length.

The second source is a Coastal Habitat Survey completed by the Heritage Council. It does not include the three coastal counties of Northern Ireland or Dublin and Kilkenny in the Republic of Ireland. However, it is an official source from a government-sponsored organisation.

The figures shown in the table are rounded to the nearest whole. As with any attempt at measuring coastal lengths, the figures are also subject to discrepancies inherent in different measuring approaches (see the coastline paradox). Counties in the Republic of Ireland are shown in normal type, while those in Northern Ireland are listed in italic type.

See also
List of islands of County Mayo
List of Irish counties by area
List of Irish counties by population
List of Irish counties by highest point

Notes

References

Area
Counties